British Indians form the largest ethno-national group in London with a population of around 542,857 or 6.6% of the population. The majority are concentrated in West London, though populations can be found throughout London.

Demographics

As at 2011, the Indian population of Greater London was 542,857 or 6.6% of the population, (including those of British Indian ethnic origin).

Religious groups
Hinduism: Some of the largest Hindu temples in Europe, the Shree Swaminarayan Mandir, is located in North West London, London. The number of Hindus in London is around 350,000, of which most are of Indian descent, and Hindus compose nearly 64% of Indians in Greater London.

Sikhism: Most Sikhs in Greater London live in West London, Southall being the heart of the community. And some also live in Bexleyheath, Erith, Hayes, Ruislip, Hounslow, Ilford, Belvedere, Osterley  and Ealing. The largest Sikh organisation in the UK is the London-based City Sikhs. The number of Sikhs in London is around 150,000, of which most are of Indian descent, and Sikhs compose over 27% of Indians in Greater London.

Islam: Around 20% of Indians in London are Muslims. They are located primarily in Newham in East London. Indian Muslims in London have strong connections to the Pakistani and Bangladeshi Muslim community of London. Most Indian Muslims came from East Africa, Jamaica, Gujarat and Mumbai.

Christianity: There are a significant number of Christian Indians in London. Most of them are from the states of Kerala and Goa. Denominations include Indian Orthodox, Catholicism, and Protestantism. There is a church in Wembley which offers church services in the Gujarati language.

Parsi: The Parsi community, which mostly comes from the state of Gujarat or from Mumbai, is also present in London.

Jainism: In 2006 it was estimated that there were 25,000 Jains in the United Kingdom.

Population spread

West London
In West London, close to Heathrow Airport, resides one of the UK's largest Indian communities. According to the 2001 Census, 39% of the people within the Ealing Southall constituency, comprising Southall and nearby areas, are of British Asian origin. Wembley and Harrow has a thriving Gujarati community while Southall being home to a thriving Punjabi community. Southall Broadway being popular among the diaspora for its Indian shops, cinemas and restaurants. Another Indian residential area is the London Borough of Hounslow.

In popular culture
Singaporean author Balli Kaur Jaswal wrote the 2017 novel Erotic Stories for Punjabi Widows, which involves the Punjabi Sikh community in London.

See also

 Indians in the New York City metropolitan area
 History of the Indian Americans in Metro Detroit
 South Asian Canadians in the Greater Toronto Area
 South Asian Canadians in Greater Vancouver

References

External links
Indian London the Museum of London
 Aden Mitra Mandal association of Indian community with historic connections to Aden, holds cultural and religious events
Live telecast from religious places from across india

Asian-British culture in London
London
Culture in London
London